Alan Martin Smith (born 21 November 1962) is an English former professional footballer who played as a striker. He is a co-commentator, and sometimes studio pundit for Sky Sports.

Playing career

Leicester City
Smith started his career at non-league Alvechurch in north-east Worcestershire, where he could combine football, with studying for a degree in Modern languages, his subjects being French, German and Spanish, at Coventry Polytechnic.

He then signed professional forms with Leicester City in June 1982. In his first season, he scored 13 goals in partnership with Gary Lineker, as the Foxes won promotion to the First Division. He spent five seasons at Leicester, scoring 84 goals in 217 appearances. In Smith's final season with the club they were relegated and he signed for Arsenal for £850.000 in March 1987, but was then loaned back to Leicester for the rest of the season.

Arsenal
Smith was one of George Graham's first major signings, and despite a hat-trick on 29 August 1987 against Portsmouth at Highbury, Smith endured a difficult start to his Arsenal career, at one point going a full two months without scoring. But Smith would prove his worth in the long term, and topped their scoring charts in four of his first five seasons. The purchase of winger Brian Marwood in March 1988 proved to be a significant turning point for Smith and Arsenal, Marwood being the most frequent supplier of his goals. The first season ended with a Littlewoods Cup final appearance at Wembley where he scored in a 3-2 defeat by Luton. 

The following season Smith won his first Golden Boot with 23 goals from 36 League games, the most important being the first goal in Arsenal's 2-0 victory at Anfield on 26 May 1989 which saw them lift that season's league championship. 1989-90 was a disappointing season both for the club and for Alan Smith goals wise. He only scored 13 goals in all competitions.

Smith was top scorer again when Arsenal claimed the title in 1990-91 and won his second Golden Boot. The league winning side were deducted two points for a brawl against Manchester United, still won the league losing only one game.

But then the goals dried up for Smith, and he was battled with Kevin Campbell for the position alongside Ian Wright. He was an unused substitute in the League Cup triumph 1993 against Sheffield Wednesday after scoring twice in the 3-1 semi-final first leg at Crystal Palace. But he played in the FA Cup success 1993, also against Sheffield Wednesday, when he was booked for the first and only time in his career. Smith never scored a more important or perfectly struck goal than the one in the 1994 European Cup Winners' Cup Final, his left-foot shot in Copenhagen stunned Parma.

His last goal for Arsenal came against Manchester City 12 December 1994 in a 2-1 win at Maine Road, and his last appearance for Arsenal came in the FA-cup third round, 7 January 1995 in a goalless draw against Millwall at The Den. A knee injury forced him to retire. Several clubs, including Watford, had expressed an interest in signing Smith just before he announced an end to his playing days in July 1995. 

Smith scored 115 goals for Arsenal. Smith has been ranked at 27th within the club's listing of the 50 greatest Gunners of all time.

England
Alan Smith gained his first full England cap against Saudi Arabia 16 November 1988. Steve Bull, then of Second Division side Wolverhampton Wanderers, was selected by Sir Bobby Robson for 1990 FIFA World Cup. Smith had just plundered ten goals in 38 games to help Arsenal finish fourth in Division One, but Bull’s 24 goals in 42 games in the Second Division caught Robson’s eye and Smith was omitted in favour of Bull. 

When Graham Taylor took over, Smith returned to the National team and his first goal came in a Friendly match against Soviet Union at Wembley 21 May 1991. His second goal came against Turkey in the Euro 1992 qualifying group match at Wembley, 16 October 1991, in a 1–0 win. The last of his 13 caps came when he replaced Gary Lineker in the 2–1 defeat by Sweden in the 1992 European Championship.

Media career
Smith is currently a regular co-commentator and sometime studio pundit for Sky Sports for the Premier League coverage. In 2011, he commentated on the Champions League final alongside Martin Tyler for the English–language world feed commentary and then in 2015, he became the regular co-commentator for the Champions League competition proper with Tyler except the final.

On 30 June 2011, EA Sports announced that Smith would replace Andy Gray as Martin Tyler's partner in commentating in FIFA 12. The pair commentated on the games up until FIFA 20 but they were both cut from the games for FIFA 21. Smith said on Twitter "Yes, gutted not to be involved with @EASPORTSFIFA anymore. For Martin Tyler and myself, it was an honour to voice the game for so long. But nothing lasts forever."

Style of play
Tall and slim, Alan Smith was well known for his headers, but during his career he demonstrated all round skills, including a deft first touch and the ability to chest the ball down or head it on for teammates to run onto. Though primarily left-footed, he scored a number of goals with his right foot. He was also known for his hold-up play.

He scored in a number of important games for Arsenal, including the 1993–94 European Cup Winners' Cup final and scored one goal in Arsenal's decisive victory at Anfield in 1989. Former Arsenal marksman Olivier Giroud has been compared to Smith.

Career statistics

Club

International

Honours
Arsenal
First Division: 1988–89, 1990–91
FA Cup: 1992–93
League Cup: 1992–93
Football League Centenary Trophy: 1988
FA Charity Shield: 1991 (shared)
UEFA Cup Winners Cup: 1993–94

Individual
PFA Team of the Year: 1988–89 Football League First Division
First Division Golden Boot: 1988–89, 1990–91

References

External links

1962 births
Living people
Sportspeople from Bromsgrove
Footballers from Worcestershire
English footballers
England semi-pro international footballers
England B international footballers
England international footballers
Association football forwards
Alvechurch F.C. players
Leicester City F.C. players
Arsenal F.C. players
English Football League players
Premier League players
First Division/Premier League top scorers
UEFA Euro 1992 players
English association football commentators
FA Cup Final players